Richard Grey Clarke (September 26, 1912 – November 23, 1993), nicknamed "Noisy", was a third baseman in Major League Baseball. He played for the Chicago White Sox in 1944.

References

External links

1912 births
1993 deaths
People from Clarke County, Alabama
Major League Baseball third basemen
Chicago White Sox players
Baseball players from Alabama
Concord Weavers players